Tara Georgina Shears (born 1969) is a Professor of Physics at the University of Liverpool.

Early life
Shears was born in Salisbury in Wiltshire. She remained in Wiltshire, living in Wootton Rivers and attending the co-educational comprehensive school Pewsey Vale School, where she was inspired by her chemistry teacher.
The school had no sixth form, and her parents moved to Wedhampton (near Urchfont), where she attended the co-educational independent school Dauntsey's School, which offered many state scholarships at the time — many of the pupils were state-funded. At A-level she studied Maths, Physics, Chemistry and English, where she was the only female in her Physics class — not uncommon in British co-educational schools, even independent schools. She obtained A grades in all her sixth form exams.

Her experience of being the only female in the Physics class would have been an advantage when she attended Imperial College London to study Physics. She obtained a 1st Class honours degree in 1991.

She went to the University of Cambridge to complete a PhD in Particle Physics at Corpus Christi College, Cambridge. She completed a PPARC  (Particle Physics and Astronomy Research Council, now the Science and Technology Facilities Council since 2007) fellowship at the Victoria University of Manchester.

Career

Particle physics
Shears was awarded a Royal Society Research Fellowship with the University of Liverpool in 2000 to continue her work at the Collider Detector at Fermilab (CDF) experimental collaboration at the Fermilab facility in the USA. In 2004 she joined the LHCb experiment at CERN's Large Hadron Collider (LHC) particle accelerator (the world's largest), for which she initiated and developed the electroweak and exotica physics working group.

Physics professor
Shears became the first female Professor of Physics at the University of Liverpool, where she researches the properties of bottom quarks using hadron colliders, testing the Standard Model theory in the electroweak sector, to seek answers for the reasons that there is so little antimatter in the universe. She is also employed as a science communicator, being able to promote female interest in physics as a role model. She is Chair of the STFC's Education, Training and Careers Committee.

Awards and Major Projects
Shears was awarded a CERN fellowship to conduct research on the Large Electron–Positron Collider (LEP). In 1995 she conducted a project: A Measurement of the B"+ and B"0 Meson Lifetimes and Lifetime Ratio Using the OPAL Detector at LEP.

See also
 Daphne Jackson, from Peterborough, the UK's first female professor of physics (University of Surrey at age 34)
 Gillian Gehring (née Murray), from Nottingham, the UK's second female professor of physics
 Women's Engineering Society

References

External links
 University of Liverpool
 Her academic page
 Dr. Tara Shears - The Large Hadron Collider in 10' (with english subtitles)
 Scientific publications of Tara Shears on INSPIRE-HEP

1969 births
Academics of the University of Liverpool
Alumni of Corpus Christi College, Cambridge
Alumni of Imperial College London
British women physicists
English physicists
Experimental physicists
Particle physicists
People associated with CERN
People educated at Dauntsey's School
People from Pewsey
People from Salisbury
Science education in the United Kingdom
Living people